Ecsenius niue is a species of combtooth blenny in the genus Ecsenius. It is found in coral reefs around Niue Island, in the eastern central Pacific ocean. It can reach a maximum length of 3.1 centimetres. Blennies in this species feed primarily off of plants, including benthic algae and weeds. The specific name refers to Niue Island, so far the only location from which E. niue is known.

References

niue
Fish described in 2002
Taxa named by Victor G. Springer